Wayland Farries Vaughan was an American ice hockey player and coach who led the Boston University Terriers men's ice hockey team from 1928 until 1943.

Career
A graduate of Yale University, Vaughan was hired as a professor of Psychology at Boston University in 1927. Shortly thereafter, he became the head coach for the ice hockey team after the resignation of Chippy Gaw in 1928. Vaughan led the team for a dozen years and stepped down after the 1940 season. After a year off, he returned after the United States entered World War II and heled the team for two more seasons before it was suspended for the duration of the war. In all, Vaughan compiled an 86-83-7 record as a head coach. He is noted for maintaining the Terriers program through trying times, including the Great Depression. Without any conference affiliation, Boston University played erratic schedules, with anywhere from 10 to 15 games per season. This changed after they joined the New England Intercollegiate Hockey League and were able to formulate a more consistent slate of games.

Personal
Vaughan was married to Clara Francis Colton and the couple had several children together.

Head coaching record

References

Year of birth missing
Year of death missing
American ice hockey coaches
Boston University Terriers men's ice hockey coaches
Yale Bulldogs men's ice hockey players